Sathi Sukanya is a 1967 Indian Kannada-language film, directed by Y. R. Swamy and produced by D. Puttaswamy. The film stars Rajkumar, Udaykumar, K. S. Ashwath and Rajashankar. The film has musical score by Rajan–Nagendra.

Cast

Rajkumar
Udaykumar
K. S. Ashwath
Rajashankar
Narasimharaju
Balakrishna
M. P. Shankar
Rathnakar
Bangalore Nagesh
Kupparaj
Vidyasagar
Srirang
Guggu
Maccheri
Harini
B. Jayashree
Rama
Indra
Janaki
Mithravinda
Nandini
Jyothi

References

External links
 

1967 films
1960s Kannada-language films
Films scored by Rajan–Nagendra
Films based on the Mahabharata
Hindu mythological films
Films directed by Y. R. Swamy